Relief Dam is a rockfill dam on Summit Creek, a tributary of the Middle Fork Stanislaus River, in Tuolumne County, California. The dam is part of the Spring Gap-Stanislaus Hydroelectric Project, and is owned and operated by Pacific Gas and Electric (PG&E).

Altogether it contains  of fill. The drainage basin behind the dam totals .

The reservoir is primarily drawn down in the late summer and fall to supplement flows to the hydroelectric powerhouses at Donnells Dam and Beardsley Dam (part of the separate PG&E Tri-Dam Project) and others on the Stanislaus River.

References

Dams in California
Dams on the Stanislaus River
Dams completed in 1910
Rock-filled dams
Buildings and structures in Tuolumne County, California